Burma sent a delegation to compete at the 1976 Summer Paralympics in Toronto, Ontario, Canada. Its athletes finished twenty eight in the overall medal count.

Medalists
 Gold - 
 Silver - 
 Bronze -

References 

Nations at the 1976 Summer Paralympics
1976
Summer Paralympics